Sidnal Shanmukhappa Basappa (6 April 1936 – 27 April 2021) was an Indian politician from Indian National Congress. He served as the Member of Parliament from Belagavi in Karnataka, for four consecutive terms.

Early life and background 
Shanmukhappa was born at Sampagaon in Belgavi district (Karnataka). Basappa Sidnal (Indian freedom fighter) was his father.

Personal life 
Shanmukhappa was married to Smt. Sushila on 8 May 1966. He was the father of two sons and one daughter.

Positions held

References

1936 births
People from Belagavi district
India MPs 1984–1989
India MPs 1989–1991
India MPs 1991–1996
India MPs 1980–1984
Karnataka politicians
Lok Sabha members from Karnataka
2021 deaths
Indian National Congress politicians from Karnataka